Brandon Michael Vera (born October 10, 1977), or also known by his ring name as The Truth, is a Filipino-American (of Italian heritage) retired mixed martial artist where he was the inaugural ONE Heavyweight Champion and the 2005 WEC Heavyweight Grand Prix Champion. A professional competitor from 2002 until 2022, he competed in the Light Heavyweight and Heavyweight divisions of ONE Championship, World Extreme Cagefighting (WEC) and Ultimate Fighting Championship (UFC).

Background
Brandon Vera grew up in a house of seven boys and three girls. He was born to a Filipino father, Ernesto, and an Italian mother, but raised by his Filipino stepmother, Amelia. He also has two other brothers and another sister outside of the family in which he was raised and they were occasionally involved in his life. Vera was born and raised in Norfolk, Virginia, and attended Lake Taylor High School where he excelled in wrestling and earned a four-year athletic scholarship to Old Dominion University. However, he dropped out of Old Dominion after a year and a half when he felt college was not for him, and enlisted himself in the United States Air Force. In the Air Force, Vera joined the wrestling team and trained at the United States Olympic Training Center in Colorado Springs, Colorado. His military wrestling career was cut short in 1999 when he tore ligaments in his right elbow. Arthroscopic surgery repaired the ligaments, but he had nerve damage from the experience, causing him to be unable to use his right arm. He was released from the Air Force on a medical discharge.

Vera returned to Virginia, where he steadily rehabilitated his arm, and eventually was fit enough to enter the Grapplers Quest submission wrestling competitions on the East Coast. There, his solitary training methods (he did not belong to a camp and trained and cut weight on his own) caught the attention of Lloyd Irvin, a Brazilian jiu-jitsu Black Belt and coach, who invited him to train with his school. At Irvin's school, he was introduced to mixed martial arts.

Mixed martial arts career

Early career
Vera's first professional mixed martial arts bout was on July 6, 2002, while training under Lloyd Irvin. He won the fight against Adam Rivera via TKO in the first round. He fought and won another bout in 2004 before entering the WEC 13 Heavyweight Tournament in 2005, where he won two bouts in one night, including a bout against The Ultimate Fighter 2's Mike Whitehead in the final.

Vera then moved to San Diego, California, on December 31, 2003, to accept a training position with City Boxing. At City Boxing, Vera excelled as a trainer and was taken under the wing of owner Mark Dion, who became his manager and introduced him to kickboxing great Rob Kaman. With Vera's success as a trainer and a mixed martial arts fighter, Dion gave Vera partial ownership of City Boxing.

Ultimate Fighting Championship

Vera made his UFC debut at Ultimate Fight Night 2 on October 3, 2005, against BJJ black belt Fabiano Scherner. Vera won the fight via KO due to knees from the clinch midway through the second round. Following the Scherner bout, he faced Justin Eilers at UFC 57, winning early in the first round by KO. At UFC 60, Vera defeated Assuerio Silva with a guillotine choke in the first round. On November 18, he stopped former heavyweight champion Frank Mir by TKO due to strikes in just 69 seconds at UFC 65 in Sacramento, California.

White had been telling the media prior to UFC 65 that the winner of the Vera-Mir fight would face the winner of the Tim Sylvia-Jeff Monson bout, which was also being held that same night, for the championship. Vera's victory secured him a championship bout against then title-holder Tim Sylvia, but a contract dispute with the UFC forced him to be replaced by Randy Couture.

In August, the UFC announced the "return" of Vera. His first fight was at UFC 77 against Sylvia, who had recently lost the UFC Heavyweight Championship to Couture. Vera lost for the first time via unanimous decision. He also broke his left hand at 4:40 of the first round.

Vera had his second loss at UFC 85 against Brazilian jiu-jitsu specialist Fabrício Werdum via TKO. The fight was controversially stopped by referee Dan Miragliotta as Werdum mounted him and landed some ground and pound. After the stoppage, Vera was upset as he felt he was defending himself effectively.

After his two recent losses, Vera dropped down to the Light Heavyweight division, facing IFL alum Reese Andy at UFC Fight Night 14 on July 19, 2008, on Spike TV. Vera defeated Andy via unanimous decision.

At UFC 89, Vera lost to Keith Jardine via a narrow split decision. Following the fight, Vera incurred criticism for his performance since his return to the UFC having been victorious in only one of his last four fights.

A more focused Vera appeared on the preliminary card of UFC 96. It was the first time Vera was not on the main card since he made his debut in the UFC. He had an impressive performance against Mike Patt, showing a more aggressive and intense striking approach and stopping him via TKO (leg kicks) in the second round.

Vera fought Polish fighter Krzysztof Soszynski at UFC 102 after his original opponent, Matt Hamill, was forced to drop out due after suffering a meniscus tear while training. Vera won via unanimous decision (30–27, 30–27, and 30–27).

Vera lost a close fight to Randy Couture via unanimous decision on November 14, 2009 at UFC 105, with the media comparing the decision to a previous UFC event (UFC 104 Machida-Rua) which prompted that MMA judging should be changed. Despite Vera significantly outstriking Couture and successfully defending numerous takedown attempts, judges awarded the victory to Couture. The verdict surprised many people; UFC commentator Joe Rogan was highly critical of the decision during the live event broadcast and in a post-fight interview, Randy Couture admitted that he didn't expect the decision to be made in his favor.

Vera faced Jon Jones on March 21, 2010, at UFC Live: Vera vs. Jones and lost via TKO in the first round after an elbow from Jones broke Vera's face in three places.

Vera was defeated by Brazilian Thiago Silva via unanimous decision (30–26, 30–27, and 30–27) on January 1, 2011 at UFC 125. At the end of the third round, Vera stood up to reveal a badly broken nose. Vera was released by the UFC with a 7–6 record in the organization. However following the fight it was revealed that his opponent Thiago Silva had failed the post-fight drug test. As a result of this, Vera was re-hired by the UFC and the result of the Silva fight was changed to a no contest, resulting in Vera's UFC record changing to 7–5–0–1.

Vera defeated Eliot Marshall on October 29, 2011 at UFC 137 via unanimous decision (29–28, 29–28, and 29–28).

Vera was briefly linked to a rematch Thiago Silva on May 15, 2012 at UFC on Fuel TV: Korean Zombie vs. Poirier. However, Vera was forced out the bout with an injury.

Vera was expected to face Australian James Te-Huna on July 11, 2012 at UFC on Fuel TV: Munoz vs. Weidman. However, Vera was pulled from the bout with Te-Huna to face Maurício Rua on August 4, 2012 at UFC on Fox: Shogun vs. Vera. Vera was defeated via TKO late in the fourth round. Vera showed great heart after being rocked early in the second round, but as both fighters showed early signs of fatigue in the late stages of the second round, Vera ultimately succumbed to Rua's power. This fight is widely considered the best performance of Vera's career, despite the loss.

Vera returned to the Heavyweight division after an absence of 5 years and faced Ben Rothwell at UFC 164 on August 31, 2013. After a competitive first and second round, Rothwell defeated Vera by TKO in the third round. Subsequent to the bout, Rothwell tested positive for elevated testosterone levels. The UFC suspended Rothwell for nine months, despite the Wisconsin commission only issuing him with an administrative warning.

Vera was released from the UFC on June 17, 2014, ending his eight-year run with the promotion.

ONE Championship

On July 13, 2014, it was confirmed that Vera had signed with Singapore-based promotion ONE FC. His debut was on December 5, 2014 against Igor Subora at ONE Fighting Championship: Warrior's Way. Vera won the fight via knockout after landing a counter straight left at 3:54 minutes in the first round.

On December 11, 2015, Vera faced Paul Cheng in the main event at ONE Championship: Spirit of Champions. He won the fight via knockout just 26 second into the first round to win the ONE Heavyweight Championship.

After nearly a year away from the cage, Vera returned to face Hideki Sekine at ONE Championship: Age of Domination on December 2, 2016. He successfully defended his heavyweight title, winning by TKO in the first round.

Vera successfully defended his title via knockout in the first round against Cage Warriors Heavyweight Champion, Mauro Cerilli who was on his promotional debut at ONE Championship: Conquest of Champions on November 23, 2018.

As the first fight of his new ten-bout contract with ONE, Vera challenged Aung La Nsang for the ONE Light Heavyweight Championship at ONE Championship: Century on October 13, 2019. Vera lost by TKO in the second round.

At ONE Championship: Fire & Fury on January 31, 2020, Vera announced that he would be defending his ONE Heavyweight Championship on May 29 in Manila, with an opponent yet to be announced. It was later announced that he would be defending his ONE Heavyweight title against Arjan Bhullar at ONE Infinity 2. Their fight was later postponed as a result of the impact of the COVID-19 pandemic on sports.

Vera faced Bhullar at ONE Championship: Dangal on May 15, 2021. Vera lost to Bhullar by second-round technical knockout, ending his five-year reign as ONE Heavyweight World Champion.

Vera faced Amir Aliakbari on December 3, 2022, at ONE 164. He lost the fight via technical knockout in the first round and announced his retirement during the post-fight interview.

Post-MMA career
After announcing his retirement in December 2022, Vera revealed that he signed a 10-movie deal as an actor in the Philippines. Prior to this announcement, Vera already appeared in a couple of Filipino movies. In 2018, Vera co-starred with Anne Curtis in the Philippine action-thriller BuyBust and starred as the lead actor in a 2022 Filipino zombie movie called Day Zero.

Personal life
Vera's former wife, Kerry, is also a mixed martial artist who formerly fought for the now-defunct Strikeforce. She was featured on the second season of Oxygen's Fight Girls. In September 2014, Kerry filed for divorce.

Vera started dating Jessica Craven and announced their engagement in April 2017. They wed on April 20, 2018 in Guam.

Vera has a tattoo on his back, inked in the Filipino writing system called Baybayin. Clockwise, it reads mundo (earth), hangin (wind), apoy (fire) and tubig (water).

While staying in the Philippines, he trained Filipino actor Richard Gutierrez in martial arts and was given a role as an assassin for Philippine primetime television show, Kamandag on the GMA Network.

In the latter part of his training for UFC 89, Vera was reportedly held at gun point by two men attempting to rob the house in which he was staying. Vera stated that the incident did not affect his performance against Keith Jardine.

In 2016, Vera revealed that he was relocating to the Philippines full time, to help grow the sport of mixed martial arts in his ancestral homeland. He has been working on opening a branch of Alliance MMA. Vera holds dual citizenship: American (by jus solis) and Filipino (by jus sanguinis).

Championships and accomplishments

Kickboxing
World Kickboxing Association
WKA Super Heavyweight Champion

Grappling
Grappler's Quest
8 Time Grappler's Quest Champion

Mixed martial arts
World Extreme Cagefighting
2005 WEC Heavyweight Grand Prix Championship
ONE Championship
ONE Heavyweight Championship (One time, first)
2 title defenses

Mixed martial arts record

|-
|Loss
|align=center|16–10 (1)
|Amir Aliakbari
|TKO (elbows and punches)
|ONE 164: Pacio vs. Brooks
|
|align=center|1
|align=center|3:37
|Pasay, Philippines
|
|-
| Loss
| align=center|16–9 (1)
| Arjan Bhullar
| TKO (punches)
| ONE: Dangal
| 
| align=center|2
| align=center|4:27 
| Kallang, Singapore
| 
|-
| Loss
| align=center|16–8 (1)
| Aung La Nsang
| TKO (punches)
| ONE: Century Part 2
| 
| align=center|2
| align=center|3:23
| Tokyo, Japan
| 
|-
| Win
| align=center|16–7 (1)
| Mauro Cerilli
| KO (punch)
| ONE: Conquest of Champions
| 
| align=center| 1
| align=center| 1:04
| Pasay, Philippines
| 
|-
| Win
| align=center|15–7 (1)
| Hideki Sekine
| TKO (body kick and punches)
| ONE: Age of Domination
| 
| align=center| 1
| align=center| 3:11
| Pasay, Philippines
| 
|-
| Win
| align=center|14–7 (1)
| Paul Cheng
| KO (punch and head kick)
| ONE: Spirit of Champions
| 
| align=center| 1
| align=center| 0:26
| Pasay, Philippines
| 
|-
| Win
| align=center| 13–7 (1)
| Igor Subora
| TKO (punch and soccer kicks)
| ONE FC: Warrior's Way
| 
| align=center| 1
| align=center| 3:54
| Pasay, Philippines
| 
|-
| Loss
| align=center| 12–7 (1)
| Ben Rothwell
| TKO (punches and knees)
| UFC 164
| 
| align=center| 3
| align=center| 1:54
| Milwaukee, Wisconsin, United States
| 
|-
| Loss
| align=center| 12–6 (1)
| Maurício Rua
| TKO (punches)
| UFC on Fox: Shogun vs. Vera
| 
| align=center| 4
| align=center| 4:03
| Los Angeles, California, United States
| 
|-
| Win
| align=center| 12–5 (1)
| Eliot Marshall
| Decision (unanimous)
| UFC 137
| 
| align=center| 3
| align=center| 5:00
| Las Vegas, Nevada, United States
| 
|-
| NC
| align=center| 11–5 (1)
| Thiago Silva
| NC (overturned)
| UFC 125
| 
| align=center| 3
| align=center| 5:00
| Las Vegas, Nevada, United States
| 
|-
| Loss
| align=center| 11–5
| Jon Jones
| TKO (elbows and punches)
| UFC Live: Vera vs. Jones
| 
| align=center| 1
| align=center| 3:19
| Broomfield, Colorado, United States
| 
|-
| Loss
| align=center| 11–4
| Randy Couture
| Decision (unanimous)
| UFC 105
| 
| align=center| 3
| align=center| 5:00
| Manchester, England, United Kingdom
| 
|-
| Win
| align=center| 11–3
| Krzysztof Soszynski
| Decision (unanimous)
| UFC 102
| 
| align=center| 3
| align=center| 5:00
| Portland, Oregon, United States
| 
|-
| Win
| align=center| 10–3
| Michael Patt
| TKO (leg kicks)
| UFC 96
| 
| align=center| 2
| align=center| 1:27
| Columbus, Ohio, United States
| 
|-
| Loss
| align=center| 9–3
| Keith Jardine
| Decision (split)
| UFC 89
| 
| align=center| 3
| align=center| 5:00
| Birmingham, England, United Kingdom
| 
|-
| Win
| align=center| 9–2
| Reese Andy
| Decision (unanimous)
| UFC Fight Night: Silva vs. Irvin
| 
| align=center| 3
| align=center| 5:00
| Las Vegas, Nevada, United States
| 
|-
| Loss
| align=center| 8–2
| Fabrício Werdum
| TKO (punches)
| UFC 85
| 
| align=center| 1
| align=center| 4:40
| London, England, United Kingdom
| 
|-
| Loss
| align=center| 8–1
| Tim Sylvia
| Decision (unanimous)
| UFC 77
| 
| align=center| 3
| align=center| 5:00
| Cincinnati, Ohio, United States
| 
|-
| Win
| align=center| 8–0
| Frank Mir
| TKO (knees and punches)
| UFC 65
| 
| align=center| 1
| align=center| 1:09
| Sacramento, California, United States
| 
|-
| Win
| align=center| 7–0
| Assuerio Silva
| Submission (guillotine choke)
| UFC 60
| 
| align=center| 1
| align=center| 2:39
| Los Angeles, California, United States
| 
|-
| Win
| align=center| 6–0
| Justin Eilers
| KO (head kick and knee)
| UFC 57
| 
| align=center| 1
| align=center| 1:25
| Las Vegas, Nevada, United States
| 
|-
| Win
| align=center| 5–0
| Fabiano Scherner
| TKO (knees and punches)
| UFC Fight Night 2
| 
| align=center| 2
| align=center| 3:22
| Las Vegas, Nevada, United States
| 
|-
| Win
| align=center| 4–0
| Mike Whitehead
| TKO (doctor stoppage)
| rowspan=2|WEC 13
| rowspan=2|
| align=center| 2
| align=center| 1:12
| rowspan=2|Lemoore, California, United States
| 
|-
| Win
| align=center| 3–0
| Andre Mussi
| KO (knees and punches)
| align=center| 1
| align=center| 0:51
| 
|-
| Win
| align=center| 2–0
| Don Richards
| Decision (unanimous)
| Next Level Fighting 1
| 
| align=center| 2
| align=center| 5:00
| Steubenville, Ohio, United States
| 
|-
| Win
| align=center| 1–0
| Adam Rivera
| TKO (punches)
| Excalibur Fighting 11
| 
| align=center| 1
| align=center| 3:20
| Richmond, Virginia, United States
|

References

Notes

External links
 Official Brandon Vera Website 

Official UFC Profile

1977 births
Living people
Mixed martial artists from Virginia
Light heavyweight mixed martial artists
Mixed martial artists utilizing collegiate wrestling
Mixed martial artists utilizing Greco-Roman wrestling
Mixed martial artists utilizing Brazilian jiu-jitsu
American people of Italian descent
American male mixed martial artists
Mixed martial arts trainers
Heavyweight mixed martial artists
American expatriates in the Philippines
American male sport wrestlers
American practitioners of Brazilian jiu-jitsu
People awarded a black belt in Brazilian jiu-jitsu
American mixed martial artists of Filipino descent
Ultimate Fighting Championship male fighters
ONE Championship champions